Edward Leo Weisacosky (May 4, 1944 – November 24, 2019) was an American football linebacker in the American Football League (AFL) and National Football League (NFL). He was drafted by the Miami Dolphins in the sixth round of the 1966 AFL Draft. He played college football at Miami (FL).

Weisacosky also played for the New York Giants and New England Patriots.

References

1944 births
2019 deaths
American football defensive ends
American football linebackers
American Football League players
Miami Dolphins players
Miami Hurricanes football players
New England Patriots players
New York Giants players
Sportspeople from Pottsville, Pennsylvania
Players of American football from Pennsylvania